The 1997 Campeonato Brasileiro Série A was the 41st edition of the Campeonato Brasileiro Série A.

It was competed for by 26 teams, and Vasco da Gama won the title.

First phase

Second phase

Final

Vasco da Gama were declared as the Campeonato Brasileiro champions because the club had scored more points than Palmeiras throughout the year.

Final standings

Top scorers

References

External links
 Results by round at bolanarea.com

1
1997